Claes Olof af Geijerstam (born 6 February 1946), nicknamed Clabbe, is a Swedish musician, radio personality and DJ who is mostly famous for his talent of rapid speech and his many years as a radio DJ.

He is also known for his role as jury member on the popular Swedish version of Pop Idol during 2004–2006. After the 2006 season, he decided to leave the programme.

Af Geijerstam was part of the pop group Ola & the Janglers in the 1960s and formed the group Malta (later renamed Nova) together with Göran Fristorp. They competed in Melodifestivalen 1973 with the song "Sommar'n som aldrig säger nej." They won the contest over ABBA, who finished in third place with their song "Ring Ring (Bara du slog en signal)." As a result of that victory, the duo represented Sweden in the Eurovision Song Contest 1973, where they translated their song into English with the title "You're Summer (You Never Tell Me No)" and finished fifth.

In 1979, af Geijerstam was the sound engineer for ABBA's North American and European tour.

See also
Idol

References

External links
 Official web page
About the ESC 1973 in Luxembourg

1946 births
Living people
Swedish DJs
Electronic dance music DJs